{{DISPLAYTITLE:C17H17NO2}}
The molecular formula C17H17NO2 may refer to:

 Apomorphine
 Asimilobine
 Dihydrexidine
 D-15414
 Etazepine
 meso-Butestrol

Molecular formulas